Samppa is a common Finnish given name. Notable people called Samppa include:

Samppa Lajunen, retired Nordic combined athlete
Samppa Hirvonen, a bass guitar musician

Finnish masculine given names